John M. and Lillian Sommerer House is a historic home located in Jefferson City, Cole County, Missouri. It was built in 1929, and is a -story Italian Renaissance style yellow brick dwelling. It has a low hipped clay tile roof with overhanging eaves.  It features a one-story front porch and porte cochere.

It was listed on the National Register of Historic Places in 2007.

References

Houses on the National Register of Historic Places in Missouri
Renaissance Revival architecture in Missouri
Houses completed in 1929
Buildings and structures in Jefferson City, Missouri
National Register of Historic Places in Cole County, Missouri